is a Japanese footballer currently playing as a midfielder for ReinMeer Aomori.

Career 
Maruoka is a product of the Cerezo Osaka academy, playing for their under-18 team from 2013 to 2015. After graduating from high school, he entered the Kindai University in 2016, and graduating from it on 2019.

On 25 April 2020, Maruoka began his professional career with Vanraure Hachinohe. On his first year as a professional, Maruoka was trusted to feature for the club in 29 league games, scoring one goal.

However, the number of appearances decreased since the 2021 season, having barely featured with Vanraure during his last two seasons with the club, which he decided to leave at the end of the 2022 season, not renewing his expiring contract.

On 11 January 2023, Maruoka was transferred to JFL club ReinMeer Aomori ahead of the 2023 season.

Personal life 

Satoru's brother, Mitsuru played in RANS Nusantara in Liga 1 Indonesia. Satoru's brother once played at Cerezo Osaka as a senior player.

Career statistics

Club 

.

Notes

References

External links

1997 births
Living people
Japanese footballers
Association football midfielders
Kindai University alumni
J3 League players
Japan Football League players
Cerezo Osaka players
Vanraure Hachinohe players
ReinMeer Aomori players